Juliette Noureddine, better known by her stage name of Juliette, is a French singer, songwriter and composer.

Biography
She was born on 25 September 1962 in the 17th arrondissement of Paris. Her grandfather, of Algerian origin, arrived in France during the 1920s. Her father, Jacques Noureddine, played the saxophone. Juliette began to learn to play the piano at the young age of seven. Juliette had her beginnings in Toulouse; after spending her teenage years in a religious institute, and after passing through the faculties of Literature and Musicology, she started playing in bars and restaurants throughout Toulouse as a pianist, performing songs by Jacques Brel and Édith Piaf. It was around the age of 18 that Juliette began to write and sing. Her first song was entitled "This evening I'm sleeping with Chopin." One evening, Juliette sang a song accompanied by the piano in a bar in Toulouse. The boss quickly hired her, and she sang there every evening for a year and a half.

In 1985 and 1986, she was present at the festival Découvertes du Printemps in Bourges, a festival that features promising young talents.  After a tour in Germany, she played the opening act for Jean Guidoni in 1990. It was at this time that she had a meeting with Pierre Philippe. She received the grand prix de la chanson française at Saarbrücken.

In 1991, she published her first album, Que Tal?. She received a nomination for the award of "Victories of Music" ("Victoires de la Musique") in 1994, and received the prize of "revelation of the year" at the same awards in 1997. She appeared at l'Olympia for the first time in 1999 for six days, and again for two days in 2005.

One of the most original and important voices of today's French music, she has released seven albums and received the medal of Chevalier des Arts et Lettres. She hosts a radio show at the France Musique station, called  Juliette or La clef des sons where every Sunday, she presents a selection of eclectic and diverse music, from pop to classical, according to her mood.

Members of the group 
Bruno Grare is the oldest member to work with Juliette. He plays the vibraphone, marimba, percussions and the trombone. He is the brother of Denis Grare, who plays with Bénabar.
Didier Bégon is the guitarist (classic and jazz), bassist, and backup singer of the group. He met Juliette in 1998 and later became a member of the group.
Karim Medjebeur plays the piano, percussions, and the bagpipe, along with a few other instruments. He is a backup singer and a dancer for Juliette (solo in the song "Lucy").
Franck Steckar plays the marimba, accordion, percussions, piano and also sings. Along with Grare, he has been a member of the band since 1993.
Phillipe Brohet plays the clarinet, bass clarinet, flute, alto sax, and baritone. He has been playing with Juliette since 1998.
Christophe Devillers plays the bass, the double bass and sings in the chorus. He is a recent addition to the group, joining in 2005 and has only worked with Juliette on her latest album Mutatis Mutandis.

Discography

Studio albums
 1993: Irrésistible
 1996: Rimes féminines
 1998: Assassins sans couteaux
 2002: Le Festin de Juliette
 2005: Mutatis Mutandis
 2008: Bijoux et Babioles
 2011: No parano
 2013: Nour
 2018: J'aime pas la chanson

Live albums
 1987: Juliette
 1991: ¿Que tal?
 1995: Juliette chante aux Halles
 1998: Deux pianos, with Didier Goret
 2005: Fantasie Heroïque (DVD) Concert au Grand Rex 2005

Compilations
 2000: Chansons et Rimes (specially edited for Quebec)
 2003: Ma vie mon œuvre (vol.1) – vingt ans, vingt chansons
 2014: Double best of – double vinyle lp
 2016: Intégrale

Awards
 Awards of the French Song on Sarrebruck (1990)
 Les Victoires de la musique "Female Revelation of the year" (1997)
 Les Victoires de la musique "Female Artist of the Year" (2006)

Filmography

References

 Translated and adapted from the article Juliette Noureddine, from French Wikipedia.
 Extra information obtained from the Website

External links
Official Site
"Clandestine" Site
Juliette ou la clef de sons (France Musique)
6 Albums of Juliette
Juliette (non-official website since 1996)

1962 births
Living people
French women singers
French musicians
French people of Algerian descent
Kabyle people
French people of Kabyle descent
Chevaliers of the Légion d'honneur
Officers of the Ordre national du Mérite
Officiers of the Ordre des Arts et des Lettres